Elmhurst Christian Reformed Church is a congregation of the Christian Reformed Church in North America located on the southern edge of Elmhurst, Illinois. It was founded in 1924 as a Baptist mission in Bellwood. The founder was a woman who had converted to Christianity after a difficult life in which she was won by her husband in a card game. After moving to Elmhurst in 1964, the congregation flourished and constructed a large new building just off of Roosevelt Road. It remains one of the largest congregations in the Christian Reformed denomination and runs many programs for children, students, adults, and seniors.

History
Elmhurst Christian Reformed Church was founded in the Chicago suburb of Bellwood. Katherine Tessman (née Lubben) was a Dutch immigrant, but she had no connection to the traditional reformed churches frequented by the Dutch American community such as the Reformed Church in America and the Christian Reformed Church. The dysfunction and tragedy of her early life gave her a strong testimony as the founder of the church.

Katherine Lubben was born in the Netherlands in 1879 and immigrated to the United States in 1891 with her mother. After reuniting with her father and siblings, the family settled first on Chicago's west side, then moved out to the area of Bellwood and Maywood, and finally settled in Naperville. It was here that she married Louis Wierenga in 1902 before moving back to Chicago. Her husband was an abusive alcoholic and in 1912, he wagered his wife in a game of cards. The winner of this card game was Albert Tessman and he proved to be a loving and caring partner. The two were married in 1914 and after a series of personal tragedies, the couple began attending the Epiphany Baptist Church at 620 North Hamlin Avenue in the West Humboldt Park neighborhood of Chicago.

Tessman had also received training in evangelism at Moody Bible Institute. In the early 1920s, she and Albert moved to Bellwood and established a church in their home on Monroe Street. She named her church the Bellwood Gospel Tabernacle, but was commissioned as a missionary by Epiphany Baptist Church in 1924. At that time, she formally established the Light of the World Rescue Mission and held weekly worship services along with evangelism and outreach ministries. The congregation flourished for more than 20 years, but with the death of her husband and her advancing age, she began to search for a denomination that would carry on the ministry after she left.

At the same time, Classis Chicago North of the Christian Reformed Church began working towards planting a church in the area of Bellwood and Maywood. The classis sent a minister to canvas the area to gauge interest in a new congregation and he came into contact with Katherine Tessman. She and the Christian Reformed Church decided to work together to maintain a Christian presence in Bellwood. The Light of the World Rescue Mission became a ministry of the First Christian Reformed Church of Cicero and Tessman was required to give up her position as a minister, since the Christian Reformed Church would not allow females in ecclesiastical offices until 1996. Tessman's church became the Bellwood Chapel in 1945 and the classis took care of filling the pulpit and funding its ministries.

In 1948, the Bellwood Chapel welcomed a new pastor, Renze De Groot, who split his time between Bellwood and another mission in Wheaton. He supported the continued growth of the congregation and in 1949, it was formally organized as the First Christian Reformed Church of Bellwood. By September 1949, when the congregation was formally organized with 50 members, Katherine Tessman was dying of cancer and she did not join the church. Within the year, the congregation began building a larger new church building on their property. In 1953, the congregation called its first full-time pastor, Bernard Byma. He would serve the church until 1960 when he left for a congregation in Lynden, Washington. It was during Byma's tenure that the Bellwood church would purchase land in Elmhurst, Illinois, preparing for a move out of Cook County along with many other Dutch churches.

The land was purchased on the corner of Kent Avenue and East Van Buren Street in Elmhurst. This was only four blocks from land that had recently been purchased by Timothy Christian School so that it could move West from Cicero. Jay De Vries was the pastor of the congregation when it moved to Elmhurst in 1964. The new brick edifice was the church home of about sixty families and the congregation renamed itself Elmhurst Christian Reformed Church. De Vries was followed by pastors Garrett Stoutmeyer, Wayne Leys, and Bert De Jong. Peter Semeyn took over as the senior pastor in 2011. On June 14, 1990, the church's steeple was struck by lightning. After smoldering through the early morning hours, flames began shooting from the steeple by sunrise and the church building experienced severe damage. The congregation met in several other facilities in the area—including the nearby Drury Lane Theater and Bryan Junior High School—but soon rebuilt and recovered. The church continued to grow until it had around 1,000 members in the mid-1990s. In the late 1990s and early 2000s, the church began to outgrow its location in spite of the annexation of several nearby properties. In 2009, the congregation made another move after constructing new building a few blocks to the south. The original Elmhurst property was sold to the Diocese of Southwest America of the Malankara Orthodox Syrian Church for use as a new parish church building. By 2012, the church had a membership of 1,542, making it one of the largest congregations in the denomination.

Beliefs

Like other congregations of the Christian Reformed Church, Elmhurst Christian Reformed Church subscribes to the Ecumenical Creeds—the Apostles' Creed, the Nicene Creed, and the Athanasian Creed—as well as three Reformed Confessions, commonly referred as the Three Forms of Unity: the Belgic Confession, the Heidelberg Catechism, and the Canons of Dort.  By way of the Covenant for Officebearers in the Christian Reformed Church, all Ministers of the Word, elders, and deacons at Elmhurst Christian Reformed Church promise "to teach the doctrines contained in these confessions diligently, to defend them faithfully, and not to contradict them, publicly or privately, directly or indirectly, in their preaching, teaching, or writing." They "pledge moreover not only to reject all errors that conflict with these doctrines, but also to refute them, and to do everything they can to keep the church free from them."

The church has identified five areas on which it focuses to carry out its mission. These are designed to reflect the core beliefs and values of the congregation. Specifically, the church emphasizes public worship to express love for God, fellowship for encouragement and accountability, discipleship to guide people to Jesus, and outreach to share the gospel with those in the community. The church also believes strongly in the importance of Christian education and pays a large portion of tuition for all children at Christian day schools in the area—notably, Timothy Christian School.

Current and former locations
 3501 Monroe Street, Bellwood, Illinois 
 Bellwood Gospel Tabernacle (1920-1924)
 Light of the World Rescue Mission (1924-1944)
 Bellwood Chapel (1944-1949)
 First Christian Reform Church of Bellwood (1949-1964)
 905 South Kent Avenue, Elmhurst, Illinois 
 Elmhurst Christian Reformed Church (1964-2009)
 149 West Brush Hill Road, Elmhurst, Illinois 
 Elmhurst Christian Reformed Church (2009–Present)

References

External links

Elmhurst Christian Reformed Church
Christian Reformed Church in North America

Churches in Illinois
Churches in DuPage County, Illinois
Christian organizations established in 1924
Elmhurst, Illinois